Jake Cavaliere (born Jacob Cavaliere, April 5, 1972, in Downey, California) is an American musician, singer, songwriter, producer and tattoo artist. He is best known for being the frontman and lead vocalist for Southern California rock and roll band Lords of Altamont, as well as his contributions as organ player and vocalist for the surf and garage combo The Bomboras.

Often known as 'The Preacher', Jake started his career in music while still attending high school with San Diego-based garage band Eastern Green and has also spent time on tour with The Cramps as a guitar technician in the mid 2000s. He has since appeared in, or recorded with acts such as : The Witchoctors, The Fuzztones, The Finks, The Bomboras, Chelsea Smiles, The Sonics, The Morlocks, The Go-Nuts, Untamed Youth, Lord Hunt & His Missing Finks, The Lords of Altamont

Discography

References

1972 births
Living people
People from Downey, California